1962 in sports describes the year's events in world sport.

Alpine skiing
 FIS Alpine World Ski Championships – 
 Men's combined champion: Karl Schranz, Austria
 Women's combined champion: Marielle Goitschel, France

American football
 NFL Championship: the Green Bay Packers won 16–7 over the New York Giants at Yankee Stadium
 Sugar Bowl (1961 season):
 The Alabama Crimson Tide won 10–3 over the Arkansas Razorbacks to win the AP and UPI Poll national championship
 The NCAA-record consecutive stadium sellout streak began at Memorial Stadium in Lincoln, Nebraska, which is still continuing today.
 AFL Championship – Dallas Texans won 20–17 over the Houston Oilers in double overtime

Artistic gymnastics
 World Artistic Gymnastics Championships
 Men's all-around champion: Yuri Titov, USSR
 Women's all-around champion: Larisa Latynina, USSR
 Team competition champions: men's – Japan; women's – USSR

Association football
 Football World Cup in Chile – Brazil won 3–1 over Czechoslovakia

United Kingdom
 FA Cup final – Tottenham Hotspur won 3-1 versus Burnley
 Football League First Division – Ipswich Town F.C won the First Division

Europe 
 European Cup – Benfica won their second European Cup 5–3 against Real Madrid

Athletics
 Seventh European Championships held from September 12 to September 16 at Belgrade
 Commonwealth Games Championships held in November at Perth, Western Australia

Australian rules football
 Victorian Football League
 Essendon wins the 66th VFL Premiership (13.12 (90) d Carlton 8.10 (58))
 Brownlow Medal awarded to Alistair Lord (Geelong)

Baseball
 The National League expands to 10 teams, adding the Houston Colt .45's and the New York Mets. The league expands its schedule from 154 to 162 games.
 January 23 – Bob Feller and Jackie Robinson are selected for the Baseball Hall of Fame in their first years of eligibility.
 October: National League pennant playoff: After finishing tied for the league lead, the Los Angeles Dodgers and San Francisco Giants played-off for the title. The Giants won the series 2 games to 1, thereby winning the National League championship.
 World Series – New York Yankees win 4 games to 3 over the San Francisco Giants. The Series MVP was Ralph Terry, New York.

Basketball
 March 2 – In Hershey, Pennsylvania, Wilt Chamberlain of the Philadelphia Warriors scored 100 points against the New York Knicks, breaking several National Basketball Association records.
 NCAA Division I Men's Basketball Championship –
 Cincinnati wins 71–59 over Ohio St.	
 NBA Finals –
 Boston Celtics won 4 games to 3 over the Los Angeles Lakers

Boxing
 March 24 – Emile Griffith regained the World Welterweight Championship by knocking out Benny the "Kid" Paret in the 12th round. Paret died ten days later on April 3 as a result of severe head injuries sustained in the fight.
 September 25 – Sonny Liston knocks out Floyd Patterson, two minutes and six seconds into the first round, to become World Heavyweight Champion.

Canadian football
 Grey Cup – Winnipeg Blue Bombers win 28–27 over the Hamilton Tiger-Cats

Cycling
 Giro d'Italia won by Franco Balmamion of Italy
 Tour de France – Jacques Anquetil of France
 UCI Road World Championships – Men's road race – Jean Stablinski of France

Golf
Men's professional
 Masters Tournament – Arnold Palmer
 U.S. Open – Jack Nicklaus
 British Open – Arnold Palmer
 PGA Championship – Gary Player
 Canadian Open – Ted Kroll
 PGA Tour money leader – Arnold Palmer – $81,448
Men's amateur
 British Amateur – Richard Davies
 U.S. Amateur – Labron Harris Jr.

Horse racing
Steeplechases
 Cheltenham Gold Cup – Mandarin
 Grand National – Kilmore

Flat races
 Australia – Melbourne Cup won by Even Stevens
 Canadian Triple Crown:
 Queen's Plate – Flaming Page
 Prince of Wales Stakes – 
 Breeders' Stakes – 
 France – Prix de l'Arc de Triomphe – Soltikoff
 Ireland – Irish Derby Stakes – 
 English Triple Crown:
 2,000 Guineas Stakes – Privy Councillor
 The Derby – Larkspur
 St. Leger Stakes – Hethersett
 United States Triple Crown Races:
 Kentucky Derby – Decidedly
 Preakness Stakes – Greek Money
 Belmont Stakes – Jaipur

Ice hockey
 Art Ross Trophy as the NHL's leading scorer during the regular season: Bobby Hull, Chicago Black Hawks
 Hart Memorial Trophy for the NHL's Most Valuable Player: Jacques Plante, Montreal Canadiens
 Stanley Cup – Toronto Maple Leafs won 4 games to 2 over the Chicago Black Hawks
 World Hockey Championship –
 Men's champion: Sweden defeated Canada
 NCAA Men's Ice Hockey Championship – Michigan Technological University Huskies defeat Clarkson University Golden Knights 7–1 in Utica, New York

Motorsport

Rugby league
1962 New Zealand rugby league season
1962 NSWRFL season
1961–62 Northern Rugby Football League season / 1962–63 Northern Rugby Football League season

Rugby union
 68th Five Nations Championship series is won by France

Swimming
 February 20 – Australian swimming ace Kevin Berry takes over the world record in the men's 200m butterfly (long course) from USA's Carl Robie at a meet in Melbourne, clocking 2:12.5.
 August 11 – Carl Robie regains the world record in the men's 200m butterfly (long course) and betters the world's best time twice in Cuyahoga Falls, Ohio, clocking 2:12.4 and, eventually, 2:10.8.
 August 19 – US swimmer Sharon Finneran breaks the world record in the women's 200m butterfly (long course) during a meet in Chicago, Illinois – 2:31.2.
 August 25 – Sharon Finneran breaks her own world record in the women's 200m butterfly (long course) during a meet in Los Altos, California – 2:30.7.
 October 23 – Australia's Kevin Berry takes over the world record in the men's 200m butterfly (long course) once again, clocking 2:09.7 at a meet in Melbourne, Victoria.

Tennis
Australia
 Australian Men's Singles Championship – Rod Laver (Australia) defeats Roy Emerson (Australia) 8–6, 0–6, 6–4, 6–4
 Australian Women's Singles Championship – Margaret Smith Court (Australia) defeats Jan Lehane O'Neill (Australia) 6–0, 6–2
England
 Wimbledon Men's Singles Championship – Rod Laver (Australia) defeats Martin Mulligan (Australia) 6–2, 6–2, 6–1
 Wimbledon Women's Singles Championship – Karen Hantze Susman (USA) defeats Věra Pužejová Suková (Czechoslovakia) 6–4, 6–4
France
 French Men's Singles Championship – Rod Laver (Australia) defeats Roy Emerson (Australia) 3–6, 2–6, 6–3, 9–7, 6–2
 French Women's Singles Championship – Margaret Smith Court (Australia) defeats Lesley Turner (Australia) 6–3, 3–6, 7–5
USA
 American Men's Singles Championship – Rod Laver (Australia) defeats Roy Emerson (Australia) 6–2, 6–4, 5–7, 6–4
 American Women's Singles Championship – Margaret Smith Court (Australia) defeats Darlene Hard (USA) 9–7, 6–4
Events
 Rod Laver becomes only the second man in tennis history to win the Grand Slam in tennis.
Davis Cup
 1962 Davis Cup –  5–0  at Milton Courts (grass) Brisbane, Australia

Volleyball
 1962 FIVB Men's World Championship in Moscow won by the USSR

Yacht racing
 The New York Yacht Club retains the America's Cup as Weatherly defeats Australian challenger Gretel, of the Royal Sydney Yacht Squadron, 4 races to 1; it is the first time in 81 years a country other than Great Britain has challenged for the Cup

Multi-sport events
 Asian Games held in Jakarta, Indonesia
 1962 British Empire and Commonwealth Games held in Perth, Australia
 Central American and Caribbean Games held in Kingston, Jamaica
 Second Winter Universiade held in Villars, Switzerland

Awards
 Associated Press Male Athlete of the Year – Maury Wills, Major League Baseball
 Associated Press Female Athlete of the Year – Dawn Fraser, Swimming
 ABC's Wide World of Sports Athlete of the Year: Jim Beatty, Athletics

References

 
Sports by year